Rome is an unincorporated community along the Ohio River in southeastern Tobin Township, Perry County, in the U.S. state of Indiana.

The community lies across the river from Stephensport, Kentucky and just off Indiana State Road 66 approximately thirteen miles east of Tell City, the county seat of Perry County.  Its elevation is 410 feet (125 m), and it is located at  (37.9233942, −86.5235905). Rome's ZIP Code is 47574.

History
Rome was first established as Washington. The name was changed to Franklin before finally settling on Rome in 1819. A post office was established at Rome that year, and remained in operation until it was discontinued in 2008. From 1819 until 1859, Rome was the second county seat of Perry County, after Troy. The Rome Courthouse was built in 1819 to mimic the first Indiana Capitol in Corydon. The small town located in the Hoosier National Forest was the home of former Indiana governor Edgar Whitcomb, during the final years of his life.

Demographics

Rome appeared only once in the U.S. Census as a separately-returned community, when in 1870 it had a population of 221. However, in 1850 an estimate published by the Census placed the population at approximately 349 inhabitants, and by 1854 the Census Office further estimated that the population had risen to 600 people.

See also
 List of cities and towns along the Ohio River

References

Unincorporated communities in Perry County, Indiana
Unincorporated communities in Indiana
Indiana populated places on the Ohio River